The eighth running of Gent–Wevelgem's women's race was held on Sunday 31 March 2019. It was the fifth event of the 2019 UCI Women's World Tour. The race started in Ypres and finished in Wevelgem, covering a distance of 136.9 km. Italian Marta Bastianelli won the previous edition in 2018.

Teams
24 teams competed in the race.

Results

See also
 2019 in women's road cycling

References

Gent-Wevelgem
Gent-Wevelgem
Gent–Wevelgem
Gent-Wevelgem (women's race)